Helen & Douglas House is a registered hospice charity (no. 1085951) based in Oxford, 
England, providing palliative, respite, end-of-life and bereavement care to life-limited children and their families.

History
Helen House was the world's first children's hospice, set up in 1982 next to All Saints Convent by an All Saints Sister Frances Ritchie to provide respite care to the families of children with life-limiting conditions. Douglas House was set up in 2004 and was the world's first hospice built specifically for young adults.
The Duchess of Cornwall is the charity's patron. The charity has been featured in two BBC documentary series, in 2007 and 2009.

Services
The hospice provides specialist palliative and respite care for children as well as end of life and bereavement care.

The care is provided by a team of doctors, nurses, carers and therapists, and is supported in the main by donations from the public, with only approximately 15% of the £5 million annual budget coming from the public sector.

The hospice announced in June 2018 that it would discontinue the Douglas House care services for young adults effective immediately, due to lack of funding.

References

External links
 

Hospitals established in 1982
1982 establishments in England
Hospices in England
Organisations based in Oxford
Buildings and structures in Oxford
Health in Oxfordshire